The 2017–18 Clemson Tigers women's basketball team represented Clemson University during the 2017–18 college basketball season. The Tigers, were led by fifth year head coach Audra Smith. The Tigers, members of the Atlantic Coast Conference, played their home games at Littlejohn Coliseum. The Tigers finished the season 1–15 in ACC play, in last place in the conference regular season.  The Tigers were the 15th seed in the ACC tournament.  They lost in the first round to Georgia Tech.

Despite receiving a three-year contract extension during the preseason, it was announced on March 27 that head coach Audra Smith would not be returning to the program for the 2018–19 season.

Roster
Source:

Schedule
Source: 

|-
!colspan=9 style="background:#522D80; color:#F66733;"| Exhibition

|-
!colspan=9 style="background:#522D80; color:#F66733;"| Non-conference regular season

|-
!colspan=9 style="background:#522D80; color:#F66733;"| ACC regular season

|-
!colspan=9 style="background:#522D80; color:#F66733;"| ACC Women's Tournament

Rankings

See also
 2017–18 Clemson Tigers men's basketball team

References

Clemson Tigers women's basketball seasons
Clemson
Clemson Tigers
Clemson Tigers